This is the German Army order of battle on the Western Front at the close of the war.

The overall commander of the Imperial German Army was Kaiser Wilhelm II, but real power resided with The Chief of the General Staff, Generalfeldmarschall Paul von Hindenburg, and his First Quartermaster, General der Infanterie Erich Ludendorff.

Order of battle
The German Army on the Western Front on 30 October 1918 was organised as 4 army groups (Heeresgruppe) controlling 13 army-level commands.

Heeresgruppe Kronprinz Rupprecht

Heeresgruppe Deutscher Kronprinz

Heeresgruppe Gallwitz

Heeresgruppe Herzog Albrecht von Württemberg

Glossary
Armee-Abteilung or Army Detachment in the sense of "something detached from an Army".  It is not under the command of an Army so is in itself a small Army.
Armee-Gruppe or Army Group in the sense of a group within an Army and under its command, generally formed as a temporary measure for a specific task.
Heeresgruppe or Army Group in the sense of a number of armies under a single commander.

See also 

German Army order of battle (1914)
German Army order of battle (Spring Offensive)

References

Bibliography 
 
 

World War I orders of battle
German Army (German Empire)